The Goteik viaduct (MLCTS: gu.hti.ta.aa.) also known as Gohteik viaduct) is a railway trestle in Nawnghkio, western Shan State, Myanmar (also known as Burma). The bridge is between the two towns of Pyin Oo Lwin, the summer capital of the former British colonial administrators of Burma, and Lashio, the principal town of northern Shan State. It is the highest bridge in Myanmar and when it was completed, the largest railway trestle in the world. It is located approximately 100 km northeast of Mandalay.

The bridge was constructed in 1899 by the Pennsylvania and Maryland Bridge Construction Company, and opened in 1900. The components were made by the Pennsylvania Steel Company and were shipped from the United States. The rail line was constructed to help expand the influence of the British Empire in the region. The construction project was overseen by Sir Arthur Rendel, engineer for the Burma Railway Company.

Bridge data

That is supposedly a measurement to the river level as it flows underground through a tunnel at the point where it passes underneath the trestle. The cost of construction was £111,200.

Due to its technical and natural condition it is considered a masterpiece of world standard.

Diversion
Because the line from Mandalay to Lashio is considered to be of strategic value, a diversionary route to the valley floor, featuring spectacular horseshoe curves, was built in 1976–1978, to keep trains running even if the Goteik viaduct was sabotaged. Those tracks were still visible from the viaduct in 2013, but the diversionary line has been left to the tropical vegetation since 2002.

Mention
The bridge is mentioned in Paul Theroux's acclaimed travelogue The Great Railway Bazaar. He described the viaduct as "a monster of silver geometry in all the ragged rock and jungle, its presence was bizarre".

See also
Rail transport in Myanmar

 Wohlers, David. Potential structural deficiencies within the Gokteik Viaduct Railway Bridge in Upper Burma (https://www.icevirtuallibrary.com/doi/full/10.1680/jenhh.21.00102?src=recsys)

 Wohlers, David C., and Tony Waters. 2022. "The Gokteik Viaduct: A Tale of Gentlemanly Capitalists, Unseen People, and a Bridge to Nowhere" Social Sciences 11, no. 10: 440.  https://www.mdpi.com/2076-0760/11/10/440

References

Railway bridges in Myanmar
Bridges completed in 1901
Tourist attractions in Myanmar
Shan State